North Hartland Dam (National ID # VT00002) is a dam on the Ottauquechee River in Hartland, Windsor County, Vermont.

It impounds the river for flood control and storm water management. The dam is owned and operated by the New England District, North Atlantic Division, U.S. Army Corps of Engineers.

Recreation includes fishing, swimming and boating in the summer, and winter sports such as snowmobiling, cross country skiing, and snowshoeing.

References

Dams in Vermont
Buildings and structures in Hartland, Vermont
Reservoirs in Vermont
United States Army Corps of Engineers dams
Dams completed in 1961
Bodies of water of Windsor County, Vermont